The presidential line of succession defines who may become or act as Constitutional President of the Dominican Republic upon the incapacity, resignation, death or by judge trial of a current President.

Current order

The Presidential line of succession, as specified by the Constitution 2010 in the article 129. The current office-holder is in parentheses:

Current President: Luis Abinader

Government of the Dominican Republic